The eighth season of the Brazilian competitive reality television series MasterChef  premiered on July 6, 2021 at 10:45 p.m. on Band.

Ana Paula Padrão returned as the host, while Érick Jacquin and Henrique Fogaça returned as judges. Paola Carosella left the show after seven seasons and was replaced by Helena Rizzo.

In addition, the show returns to its standard format instead of the "two-test, one winner per episode" format used in the seventh season.

The grand prize is R$300.000, a scholarship on Le Cordon Bleu, a year's shop card on Amazon.com worth R$5.000 per month, kitchen products from  Britânia and Brastemp, a trip to "an unforgettable gastronomic destination" and the MasterChef trophy.

Actress Isabella Scherer won the competition over college student Eduardo Prado and lawyer Kelyn Kuhn on December 14, 2021.

Contestants
This season features three contestants who had previously appeared on season 7 – Heitor Cardoso, Juliana Arraes and Renato Nogueira; as well two contestants who had previously appeared on MasterChef Junior 1 – Daphne Sonnenschein and Eduardo Prado.

Top 23

Elimination table

Key

Ratings and reception

Brazilian ratings

All numbers are in points and provided by Kantar Ibope Media.

References

External links
 MasterChef on Band

2021 Brazilian television seasons
MasterChef (Brazilian TV series)